Naama Lazimi (born 11 January 1986) is a politician and Member of the Knesset for the Labor Party. Previously, she was a member of the Haifa City Council and vice chairman of the Student Association at the University of Haifa. She is also involved in LGBT rights activism.

Biography 
Naama Lazimi was born and raised in Migdal HaEmek to Moroccan Jewish parents. Her father, Avi, was a school principal and deputy mayor of Migdal HaEmek. She studied at the local school 'Rogozin', served in the IDF as an officer in the Ministry of Defense and later as a reserve officer in the Home Front Command. She studied political science and Jewish history at the University of Haifa. As a student she was vice-chair of the University Student Association.

Political career 
Lazimi worked as a parliamentary adviser to Knesset member Shelly Yachimovich. She founded the Center for Political Training and Resolution of the "Vision" conflict within the Peace Now organization, and chaired the finance committee of the Koah LaOvdim organization. In 2012 she was elected to the Labor Party conference. In 2016, as chairman of the Young Shift of the Labor Party in Haifa, she ran for the presidency of the National Young Shift but lost by a narrow margin.

In the second decade of the 21st century, she moved to the Hadar HaCarmel neighborhood of Haifa. In the run-up to the local elections in Israel held in November 2018, an agreement was signed between Einat Kalisch-Rotem and the head of the Labor Party, Avi Gabbay, according to which Lazimi was placed third on Kalisch-Rotem's list. In the election, the list won four seats and the mayoralty, and Lazimi was elected a member of the city council. As part of this role, she chaired the Haifa Gender Equality Committee and the board of directors of the Haifa Museums Company, and was a member of the Audit, Welfare and Construction Committees, and the Shikmona Board of Public Housing. She conducted a collaboration between the Technion and the ORT Braude College of Engineering on behalf of ISEF - Israel Scholarship Education Foundation. In addition, she worked as a consultant for the northern field at the Jewish National Fund.

In February 2021, ahead of the twenty-fourth Knesset elections, Lazimi was elected in the primaries to the 9th place on the Labor Party list, which received seven seats.

Following the resignation of Omer Bar-Lev from the Knesset under the Norwegian Law, she entered the Knesset for the first time.

In August 2022, ahead of the twenty-fifth Knesset elections, Lazimi was elected in the primaries to the 1st place on the Labor Party list, second only to party leader Merav Michaeli.

References

External links

1986 births
Living people
21st-century Israeli military personnel
21st-century Israeli women politicians
City councillors of Haifa
Israeli Jews
Israeli Labor Party politicians
Israeli officers
Israeli women activists
Jewish human rights activists
Jewish Israeli politicians
Jewish military personnel
Israeli LGBT rights activists
Members of the 24th Knesset (2021–2022)
Members of the 25th Knesset (2022–)
People from Migdal HaEmek
University of Haifa alumni
Women members of the Knesset